Toney is an unincorporated community in the northwestern part of Madison County, Alabama, United States.  It is part of the Huntsville-Decatur Combined Statistical Area.

Geography
Limestone Creek flows through the community, which is just a few miles south of its source in Lincoln County, Tennessee, before flowing into Limestone County.

Public services
The Toney Volunteer Fire Department and the Madison County Sheriff's Department provide fire and police services in the Toney area .

A post office is located in the community.

Toney is part of the Madison County school  district. Two of the system's schools are in Toney: Madison Cross Roads (grades K-5) and Sparkman Middle (grades 6-8). Toney students in grades 9-12 go to Sparkman High School in nearby Harvest.  Toney once possessed its own school, but the Toney School is no longer in existence.

References

External links

Huntsville-Decatur, AL Combined Statistical Area
Unincorporated communities in Madison County, Alabama
Unincorporated communities in Alabama